Makogonovo is a rural locality (a selo) in Serikovskoye Rural Settlement, Buturlinovsky District, Voronezh Oblast, Russia. The population was 193 as of 2010. There are 2 streets.

Geography 
Makogonovo is located 28 km northeast of Buturlinovka (the district's administrative centre) by road. Serikovo is the nearest rural locality.

References 

Rural localities in Buturlinovsky District